KDKI-LP is an Adult Standards, Jazz, Big Band, and Swing formatted broadcast radio station licensed to and serving Twin Falls, Idaho.  KDKI-LP is owned and operated by Tamarack Community Broadcasting, Inc.

References

External links
 103.9 KDKI Online
 

2014 establishments in Idaho
Adult standards radio stations in the United States
Jazz radio stations in the United States
Radio stations established in 2014
DKI-LP